In rail transport, the paid area is a dedicated "inner" zone in a railway station or metro station, accessible via turnstiles or other barriers, to get into which, visitors or passengers require a valid ticket, checked smartcard or a pass. A system using paid areas is often called fare control. Passengers are allowed to enter or exit only through a faregate. A paid area usually exists in rapid transit railway stations for separating the train platform from the station exit, ensuring a passenger has paid or prepaid before reaching the railway platform and using any transport service. Such design requires a well-organized railway station layout. In some systems, paid areas are named differently - for example, on railways in the United Kingdom they are called compulsory ticket areas.

The paid area is similar in concept to the airside at an airport. However, in most cases entrance to the paid area requires only a valid ticket or transit pass. The exception is in certain cases of international rail travel, where passengers must also pass through immigration control and customs to enter the paid area. Examples include the Eurostar international platforms at St Pancras railway station and Gare du Nord, Woodlands Train Checkpoint in Singapore, where the only departures are to neighbouring Malaysia, as well as Hung Hom station, Lo Wu station, Lok Ma Chau station and Hong Kong West Kowloon station in Hong Kong.

In some rapid transit systems, passengers are banned from eating or drinking inside the paid area of every station.

Platform ticket 

A platform ticket allows non-travelers access to the paid area of a station to make a platform tour, seek for departures of friends or relatives, greet friends and family members or to assist them with their luggage without having to have a ticket for a journey. These are generally available only at major terminal stations, but other smaller stations occasionally grant platform tickets in exchange for a piece of identification.

Similarly, in some airports, such as the Pittsburgh International Airport, non-ticketed members of the public can acquire an airside access pass to visit the shops and restaurants inside the restricted area, as long as they produce a valid piece of identification and go through the security checkpoint.

See also 

 Turnstile

References 

 MTR BY-LAWS by Hong Kong Regulations

Passenger rail transport